Bryan D. Andrews (born 1975) is an American storyboard artist and writer known for his work in science fiction and superhero films. Born in 1975, Andrews began his film career with a credit in Warner Bros. Feature Animation's 1998 film Quest for Camelot. He contributed to Joseph: King of Dreams, Jackie Chan Adventures, Samurai Jack, My Life as a Teenage Robot, and various installments of the Marvel Cinematic Universe, such as Doctor Strange and Avengers: Endgame. Andrews also worked alongside Genndy Tartakovsky to produce the animated series Sym-Bionic Titan for Cartoon Network, which ran for 20 episodes.

Andrews was recognized at both the 2004 and 2005 Primetime Emmy Awards for his work on Star Wars: Clone Wars in the category "Outstanding Animated Program (for Programming one Hour or More). He has since received two Primetime Emmys for his work on Samurai Jack, one Primetime Emmy nomination each for Samurai Jack and Escape from Cluster Prime, one Art Directors Guild award for Avengers: Endgame, and one nomination for Doctor Strange.

Career
Bryan D. Andrews was born in 1975. His first film credit was for the 1998 Warner Bros. Feature Animation film Quest for Camelot, on which he worked as a layout assistant. After working on other projects such as Joseph: King of Dreams, Jackie Chan Adventures, and Samurai Jack, Andrews received his first Primetime Emmy Award win in 2004 for Outstanding Animated Program (for Programming One Hour or More) for his work on Star Wars: Clone Wars, an animated television short series created by Genndy Tartakovsky, who also worked with Andrews on Samurai Jack for Cartoon Network. Another Primetime Emmy Award the following year in the same category was given to Andrews alongside the series crew for their work on Clone Wars. Andrews would go on to be nominated twice, with one win, for the Primetime Emmys for his work on the Samurai Jack episode "The Four Seasons of Death". In 2006, Andrews received his second Primetime Emmy nomination as a writer for the My Life as a Teenage Robot special Escape from Cluster Prime.

Along with Genndy Tartakovsky and Paul Rudish, he co-created the animated television series Sym-Bionic Titan, which premiered on Cartoon Network on September 17, 2010. After 20 episodes, however, it was canceled due to lack of merchandise connected to the series, with the final episode airing April 9, 2011. He also worked with Tartakovsky as a storyboard artist on Iron Man 2, contributing to the climactic final action sequence.

Personal life
Andrews has a Bachelor of Fine Arts degree from the California Institute of the Arts.

Filmography

Accolades

References

External links
 

American animators
American male screenwriters
American television writers
American storyboard artists
Living people
American male television writers
Place of birth missing (living people)
Annie Award winners
Cartoon Network Studios people
Sony Pictures Animation people
1975 births